The Latin Grammy Award for Producer of the Year is an honor presented annually at the Latin Grammy Awards, a ceremony that recognizes excellence and creates a wider awareness of cultural diversity and contributions of Latin recording artists, in the United States and internationally. The award is given to a producer whose recordings released during the eligibility period represent extraordinary creativity in the area of record production. Six individual songs, or 51% of the duration of an album, are the minimum for a producer to be eligible. Two or more producers can participate as a team only if they have worked together during the period of eligibility.

The award for Producer of Year was first presented to the Cuban songwriter Emilio Estefan in 2000. In that year Estefan produced the albums Ciego de Amor by Charlie Zaa, El Amor de Mi Tierra by Carlos Vives and the song "Da la Vuelta", performed by Marc Anthony, and was awarded as the first Person of the Year by the Latin Academy of Recording Arts & Sciences. Italian singer-songwriter Laura Pausini became the first female artist to be nominated for this category, for producing her album Entre Tu y Mil Mares. At the 2010 ceremony, joint winners were announced for the first time, when Jorge Calandrelli and Gregg Field were honored for their work on A Time for Love by Cuban trumpeter Arturo Sandoval; they shared the award with Sergio George, who holds the record for the most wins with four accolades, and most nominations with eight. Eduardo Cabra has won three times. Cachorro López has earned seven nominations which resulted in two wins. Gustavo Santaolalla has been nominated six times and received the award in 2005. In 2018, Venezuelan trumpetist Linda Briceño became the first female producer awarded. Since its inception, the award has been presented to musicians originating from Argentina, Colombia, Cuba, Dominican Republic, Peru, Puerto Rico, Spain, the United States, and Venezuela.

Winners and nominees

2000s

2010s

2020s

 Each year is linked to the article about the Latin Grammy Awards held that year.

See also
Billboard Latin Music Award for Producer of the Year
Grammy Award for Producer of the Year

References

General
  Note: User must select the "Production Field" category as the genre under the search feature.

Specific

External links
Official site of the Latin Grammy Awards

 
Producer of the Year